Stefan Aleksander Okrzeja (born 3 April 1886 in Dębe Wielkie, Mińsk County, executed 21 July 1905 in Warsaw) was a Polish worker, socialist and activist for Poland's independence.

Early life and activism
Stefan Okrzeja was a son of  a railway track-walker. He worked as a painter, then as an iron worker in various factories in Warsaw. He joined the illegal Polish Socialist Party (PPS) in 1904, soon becoming a member of its Warsaw Committee. He took part in many anti-tsarist  demonstrations. During the famous demonstration on Grzybowski Square on 13 November 1904 he was the one who carried the red banner. He became a key member of the Combat Organization of the Polish Socialist Party that was responsible for protecting workers meetings and demonstrations and was organizing attacks against Russian police officers or high rank officials. Okrzeja distinguished himself in many combat actions as a commander of a party consisted of ten fighters.

Last action, trial and execution
On 26 March 1905, Okrzeja made an attempt to assassinate a police officer. He threw a bomb into the police post on Wileńska Street on Praga. The explosion demolished the post, but Okrzeja was within the range. Badly wounded and unable to escape, he was arrested and imprisoned in the infamous 10th Pavilion of Warsaw Citadel. According to the fact he was caught red-handed, the trial before a district court was very short, despite the passionate defence by Stanisław Patek. Okrzeja was sentenced to death and executed soon afterwards, on 21 July 1905.

Legacy
By his deeds and martyrdom, Stefan Okrzeja became a hero of Polish Socialist Party and an icon of its fight for independent Poland and workers rights. Writer Gustaw Daniłowski wrote a short story about his life. It was first published by the underground PPS printing house. When Poland regained its independence in 1918, Okrzeja was counted into a pantheon of national heroes. His name was given to the 28th Infantry Division and to a street on Praga, not far away from the place of his last combat action.

References
 Jan Tomicki, Polska Partia Socjalistyczna, Książka i Wiedza, Warszawa 1983

1886 births
1905 deaths
People from Mińsk County
Polish Socialist Party politicians
Combat Organization of the Polish Socialist Party members
Polish people executed by the Russian Empire
Recipients of the Cross of Independence with Swords
Commanders of the Order of Polonia Restituta
Executed people from Masovian Voivodeship
Polish assassins
20th-century executions by Russia
Failed assassins
People executed for attempted murder
20th-century Polish criminals